Parilla was an Italian motorcycle manufacturing company. It was founded in 1946 by Giovanni Parrilla, who dropped an 'R' in his name for the company title.  He began by designing, building and racing a 248cc single cylinder, ohc motorcycle, which he modified to take a dohc.  After this, he produced a variety of road bikes with; 98cc, 125cc and 250cc engines.  In 1952 motorcycle designer Soncini was appointed and improved the range of motorcycles available.  In the early 60s Parrilla experimented with a 125cc rotary-valve two-stroke attached to a 5-speed gearbox, but this project was abandoned and the company folded in 1967.

List of models (incomplete) 
125 Sport 
175 Turismo Speciale
250 Boxer
Fox 
Fox SS
Slughi 150
Veltro Twin

References

External links 
Parilla History

Defunct motorcycle manufacturers of Italy